Lízino štěstí is a 1939 Czechoslovak film starring Josef Kemr.

References

External links
 

1939 films
1930s Czech-language films
Czech romantic drama films
Czechoslovak romantic drama films
1930s romance films
Czechoslovak black-and-white films
1930s Czech films